Rebecca Jackson is a former Republican politician from Louisville, Kentucky. She previously served as the Jefferson County Judge/Executive and also ran unsuccessfully for the Republican party nomination for governor. She is the former chief executive officer of the WHAS Crusade for Children, a local charity that operates a large annual telethon. She is retired from CEO of Mastery Mavens, an internet-based professional development tool for teaching professionals.

Education

Jackson graduated from Southern High School in Louisville and earned bachelor's and master's degrees from the University of Louisville.

Teaching career

Jackson began her career as a teacher for children with special needs in the Jefferson County Public Schools (JCPS) in 1973. She taught grades K–12 in a variety of schools.  She was promoted to learning specialist, an administrative position. Jackson left JCPS and took a position as director of the Parent Education Project at the University of Louisville.  In 1987, Jackson founded JobCenter, Inc., a not-for-profit employment agency placing persons with special needs in businesses in the community.

Political career

Jackson first won elected office in 1989, upsetting a long-time Democratic incumbent Jefferson County clerk Jim Malone. She was re-elected in 1993. In 1998, Jackson ran for and won the race for Judge/Executive, and served one term. She was the last person to serve in that office before city and county governments merged in 2002; the office was largely replaced by the Mayor of Louisville Metro, though technically the office still exists in a largely ceremonial capacity. Jackson had been a staunch proponent of a consolidated city-county government.

Jackson represented the United States as an observer to the December 1993 elections in Russia, after the country adopted a new constitution and elected the first persons to the re-established State Duma. She represented the United States in Bulgaria as one of two specialists on how to establish a primary election for the many factions of the pro-democracy movement. In the following election, the pro-democracy movement unseated the communist parliament and took back the office of Prime Minister. Jackson also traveled to China on a National Association of Counties trade mission.

Activism career
Jackson ran for governor in 2003, losing in the primary election to Ernie Fletcher, who eventually won the seat. After the defeat, she started working in Romanian schools in Constanta to develop methods of teaching children with special needs in regular classrooms, after these children were mainstreamed from special schools to local schools by government legislation. She also visited and worked with the Franciscan Sisters who founded the Fundatia Surorile Clarise, an orphanage in Bralia.

Jackson joined the WHAS Crusade for Children in 2005, the first person from outside the WHAS-TV corporate structure to hold the post. She was instrumental in establishing an endowment for the telethon, funded by bequests from people who left donations to the Crusade  in their wills. The endowment is designed to fund the day-to-day operating expenses of the organization, allowing 100 percent of the donations collected from the general public to go directly to agencies providing direct services to children with special needs.

Jackson is the author of the children's book Mackenzie And The Baby Robin. Released in 2004, the book has a religious message and features her oldest grandchild, Mackenzie. The book was illustrated by her cousin, Richard Wayne Thompson.

Personal
On the web site of her gubernatorial campaign, Jackson listed her "first home" as Short Creek, Kentucky.

Jackson has been married to Ralph W. Jackson since 1969. The couple has three sons, three granddaughters, a grandson, two step-granddaughters and a foster daughter.

Jackson is also active in her church, Highview Baptist Church. In 1980, she founded Kentucky's New Horizons, a ministry of Highview Baptist that is a social-recreation program for adults with handicaps. She has directed it ever since. In 2006, she was appointed by Governor Fletcher to the Board of Trustees for the University of Louisville.

References

External links

County judges in Kentucky
Politicians from Louisville, Kentucky
University of Louisville people
Kentucky Republicans
Women in Kentucky politics
Year of birth missing (living people)
Living people
Southern High School (Kentucky) alumni
Kentucky women in politics
21st-century American women